A prefabricated building, informally a prefab, is a building that is manufactured and constructed using prefabrication. It consists of factory-made components or units that are transported and assembled on-site to form the complete building.

History

Buildings have been built in one place and reassembled in another throughout history. This was especially true for mobile activities, or for new settlements. Elmina Castle, the first slave fort in West Africa, was also the first European prefabricated building in Sub-saharan Africa. In North America, in 1624 one of the first buildings at Cape Ann was probably partially prefabricated, and was rapidly disassembled and moved at least once. John Rollo described in 1801 earlier use of portable hospital buildings in the West Indies. Possibly the first advertised prefab house was the "Manning cottage". A London carpenter, Henry Manning, constructed a house that was built in components, then shipped and assembled by British emigrants. This was published at the time (advertisement, South Australian Record, 1837) and a few still stand in Australia. One such is the Friends Meeting House, Adelaide.
The peak year for the importation of portable buildings to Australia was 1853, when several hundred arrived. These have been identified as coming from Liverpool, Boston and Singapore (with Chinese instructions for re-assembly). In Barbados the Chattel house was a form of prefabricated building which was developed by emancipated slaves who had limited rights to build upon land they did not own. As the buildings were moveable they were legally regarded as chattels.

In 1855 during the Crimean War, after Florence Nightingale wrote a letter to The Times, Isambard Kingdom Brunel was commissioned to design a prefabricated modular hospital. In five months he designed the Renkioi Hospital: a 1,000 patient hospital, with innovations in sanitation, ventilation and a flushing toilet. Fabricator William Eassie constructed the required 16 units in Gloucester Docks, shipped directly to the Dardanelles. Only used from March 1856 to September 1857, it reduced the death rate from 42% to 3.5%.

The world's first prefabricated, pre-cast panelled apartment blocks were pioneered in Liverpool. A process was invented by city engineer John Alexander Brodie, whose inventive genius also had him inventing the football goal net. The tram stables at Walton in Liverpool followed in 1906. The idea was not extensively adopted in Britain, however was widely adopted elsewhere, particularly in Eastern Europe.

Prefabricated homes were produced during the Gold Rush in the United States, when kits were produced to enable Californian prospectors to quickly construct accommodation. Homes were available in kit form by mail order in the United States in 1908.

Prefabricated housing was popular during the Second World War due to the need for mass accommodation for military personnel. The United States used Quonset huts as military buildings, and in the United Kingdom prefabricated buildings used included Nissen huts and Bellman Hangars. 'Prefabs' were built after the war as a means of quickly and cheaply providing quality housing as a replacement for the housing destroyed during the Blitz. The proliferation of prefabricated housing across the country was a result of the Burt Committee and the Housing (Temporary Accommodation) Act 1944. Under the Ministry of Works Emergency Factory Made housing programme, a specification was drawn up and bid on by various private construction and manufacturing companies. After approval by the MoW, companies could bid on Council led development schemes, resulting in whole estates of prefabs constructed to provide accommodation for those made homeless by the War and ongoing slum clearance. Almost 160,000 had been built in the UK by 1948 at a cost of close to £216 million. The largest single prefab estate in Britain was at Belle Vale (South Liverpool), where more than 1,100 were built after World War 2. The estate was demolished in the 1960s amid much controversy as the prefabs were very popular with residents at the time.

Prefabs were aimed at families, and typically had an entrance hall, two bedrooms (parents and children), a bathroom (a room with a bath)  — which was a novel innovation for many Britons at that time, a separate toilet, a living room and an equipped (not fitted in the modern sense) kitchen. Construction materials included steel, aluminium, timber or asbestos, depending on the type of dwelling. The aluminium Type B2 prefab was produced as four pre-assembled sections which could be transported by lorry anywhere in the country.

The Universal House (pictured left & lounge diner right) was given to the Chiltern Open Air Museum after 40 years temporary use. The Mark 3 was manufactured by the Universal Housing Company Ltd, Rickmansworth.

The United States used prefabricated housing for troops during the war and for GIs returning home. Prefab classrooms were popular with UK schools increasing their rolls during the baby boom of the 1950s and 1960s.

Many buildings were designed with a five-ten year life span, but have far exceeded this, with a number surviving today. In 2002, for example, the city of Bristol still had residents living in 700 examples. Many UK councils have been in the process of demolishing the last surviving examples of Second World War prefabs in order to comply with the British government's Decent Homes Standard, which came into effect in 2010. There has, however, been a recent revival in prefabricated methods of construction in order to compensate for the United Kingdom's current housing shortage.

Prefabs and the modernist movement
Architects are incorporating modern designs into the prefabricated houses of today. Prefab housing should no longer be compared to a mobile home in terms of appearance, but to that of a complex modernist design. There has also been an increase in the use of "green" materials in the construction of these prefab houses. Consumers can easily select between different environmentally friendly finishes and wall systems. Since these homes are built in parts, it is easy for a home owner to add additional rooms or even solar panels to the roofs. Many prefab houses can be customized to the client's specific location and climate, making prefab homes much more flexible and modern than before.

There is a zeitgeist or trend in architectural circles and the spirit of the age favors the small carbon footprint of "prefab".

Efficiency 
The process of building pre-fabricated buildings has become so efficient in China that a builder in Changsha built a ten-storey building in 28 hours and 45 minutes.

Sustainability 

Prefabricated construction generates less carbon footprint, improves energy use and efficiency, and produces less waste, making it more sustainable and environmentally friendly, and compliant with sustainable design standards.

Modular Architecture 
The modular architecture allows, thanks to 3D modeling, the design and construction of the modular structure outside the site where it will be installed.  This offers several advantages such as more sustainable design, greater cost and time savings and standardization of design.  This is especially important for large-scale construction projects.

In communist countries

Many eastern European countries had suffered physical damage during World War II and their economies were in a very poor state. There was a need to reconstruct cities which had been severely damaged due to the war. For example, Warsaw had been practically razed to the ground under the planned destruction of Warsaw by German forces after the 1944 Warsaw Uprising. The centre of Dresden, Germany, had been totally destroyed by the 1945 Allied bombardment. Stalingrad had been largely destroyed and only a small number of structures were left standing.

Prefabricated buildings served as an inexpensive and quick way to alleviate the massive housing shortages associated with the wartime destruction and large-scale urbanization and rural flight.

Prefabricated commercial buildings

McDonald's uses prefabricated structures for their buildings, and set a record of constructing a building and opening for business within 13 hours (on pre-prepared ground works).

In the UK, the major supermarkets have each developed a modular unit system to shop building, based on the systems developed by German cost retailer Aldi and the Danish supermarket chain Netto.

See also
Kit house
MAN steel house
Modular building
Prefabricated home
Prefabrication

References 

19- "Prefabricated Modular Steel Structures Offer Numerous Advantages For The Construction Industry". www.dorce.com 3 July 2020.

External links

National Association of Home Builders (US) - "NAHB's Building Systems Council's Concrete, Log, Modular, and Panelized Homes
Estate of Prefabs in SE London is listed for preservation
Full questions and answers to building a prefab home
 A Controversial House in Arlington Heights

Warehouses
Building engineering
Buildings and structures by type
Prefabricated buildings
Building
Buildings and structures